Tómasson is a surname of Icelandic origin, meaning son of Tómas. In Icelandic names, the name is not strictly a surname, but a patronymic. The name refers to:
Haukur Tómasson (b. 1960), Icelandic composer
Helgi Tómasson (1896–1958), Icelandic physician and psychiatrist
Helgi Tómasson (dancer) (b. 1942), Iceland-born ballet dancer and artistic director of the San Francisco Ballet company (California, USA)
Jon Dahl Tomasson (b. 1976), Danish former football player and manager
Michael Tomasson (b. 1963), American physician scientist and expert in hematologic malignancy